The 1972 Georgia Tech Yellow Jackets football team represented the Georgia Institute of Technology in the 1972 NCAA University Division football season. The Yellow Jackets were led by first-year head coach Bill Fulcher and played their home games at Grant Field in Atlanta.  They were invited to the 1972 Liberty Bowl, where they defeated Iowa State, 31–30.

Schedule

Source:

Roster

References

Georgia Tech
Georgia Tech Yellow Jackets football seasons
Liberty Bowl champion seasons
Georgia Tech Yellow Jackets football